Daştatük is a village and municipality in the Lankaran Rayon of Azerbaijan. It has a population of 878. The municipality consists of the villages of Daştatük, Aşağı Apu, and Rəzvan.

References 

Populated places in Lankaran District